Deliberation Day is a proposed holiday promoting deliberative democracy. The proposal was suggested by American political scientists Bruce Ackerman and James Fishkin and would supplement or replace Presidents' Day in the United States. On Deliberation Day, all registered voters would be invited to participate in public community discussions about the upcoming elections, and would be given financial compensation for their involvement in order to encourage the participation of those who are less interested in politics.

This is one of several electoral reforms proposed for the U.S.

See also
Deliberative opinion poll
Deliberative democracy
 Electoral reform in the United States

References

Further reading
Ackerman, Bruce, "Deliberation Day" (2002). Faculty Scholarship Series. Paper 162. http://digitalcommons.law.yale.edu/fss_papers/162

Schkade, David, Sunstein, Cass R. and Hastie, Reid, What Happened on Deliberation Day? (June 2006). U Chicago Law & Economics, Olin Working Paper No. 298; AEI-Brookings Joint Center Working Paper No. 06-19. Available at SSRN: http://ssrn.com/abstract=911646 or  Mirror at https://web.archive.org/web/20120619165424/http://www.law.uchicago.edu/files/files/298.pdf

Public holidays in the United States
Group decision-making